The Council of Churches in Zambia is an ecumenical Christian organization in Zambia. It was founded in 1944 as the Christian Council of Northern Rhodesia and is a member of the World Council of Churches and the Fellowship of Christian Councils in Southern Africa. It is also a member of three church mother bodies in Zambia; Evangelical Fellowship of Zambia (EFZ), and the Zambia Episcopal Conference (ZEC).

External links

World Council of Churches listing

Christian organizations established in 1944
Members of the World Council of Churches
Christian organizations based in Africa
Churches in Zambia
Zambia